Bullmoose was a Canadian rock band.

Bullmoose may also refer to:

 a style of bicycle handlebar
 General Bullmoose, a character from a satirical American comic strip Li'l Abner

See also
 Bull Moose (disambiguation)
 Bull Moose Party, in the United States